Aurelia Szőke-Tudor (1936 – 16 October 2013), formerly known as Aurelia Sălăgean or as Aurelia Sălăgeanu, was a Romanian handballer who played for the Romanian national team. At club level, she played for Târgu Mureș, Știința București or Rapid București.

International trophies   
European Champions Cup:
Winner: 1961, 1964
World Championship:
Gold Medalist: 1956, 1960, 1962

References 

People from Cluj County
1936 births
2013 deaths
Romanian female handball players